The individual show jumping is an equestrian event on the Olympic programme. It is the oldest of the six events on the current programme, debuting in 1900 as one of the first Olympic equestrian events. No equestrian events were held in 1904 or 1908; when the sport returned in 1912, individual jumping was joined by team jumping, individual and team eventing, and individual dressage. Individual jumping has been held at every Games since. Other jumping-related events held only once were high jump and long jump competitions in 1900 and individual and team vaulting competitions in 1920.

Medalists

Multiple medalists

Medalists by country

References

Jumping individual